Horse Camp is a rural locality in the Bundaberg Region, Queensland, Australia.

References 

Bundaberg Region
Localities in Queensland